Krishna Paswan is an Indian politician and member of the Bharatiya Janata Party. Paswan is a member of the Uttar Pradesh Legislative Assembly from the Khaga constituency in Fatehpur district.

References 

People from Fatehpur district
Bharatiya Janata Party politicians from Uttar Pradesh
Uttar Pradesh MLAs 2017–2022
Living people
Year of birth missing (living people)
Uttar Pradesh MLAs 2022–2027